Hagenthal-le-Bas is a commune in the Haut-Rhin department in Alsace in north-eastern France. The Château de la famille d'Eplingen there has been owned by the town since 2003 and been a listed historical monument since 2010.

See also
 Communes of the Haut-Rhin département

References

Communes of Haut-Rhin